New York State Route 474 (NY 474) is a state highway located entirely within Chautauqua County in the westernmost corner of New York in the United States. It begins at the section of the Pennsylvania state line that runs north–south and runs eastward, initially paralleling the state line before taking a more northeasterly alignment toward Chautauqua Lake. The route ends adjacent to the lake at a junction with NY 394 in the town of Busti. NY 474 was originally designated as New York State Route 74 in 1930 before being renumbered to NY 474 on July 1, 1972. The route continues westward into Pennsylvania as Pennsylvania Route 474 (PA 474), which was assigned in the 1980s.

Route description

NY 474 begins at the Pennsylvania state line in the town of French Creek as a continuation of PA 474, which in turn begins a short distance west of the state line in Wattsburg, Pennsylvania. NY 474 heads east through rural southwest Chautauqua County, briefly paralleling French Creek to the hamlet of Marvin before intersecting and briefly overlapping with NY 426 through the small hamlet of Cutting. NY 474 exits Cutting and continues on an easterly track into the town of Clymer and the hamlet of the same name, where it meets County Route 15 (CR 15), a local road leading from the Pennsylvania state line (where the road continues south to Corry) north to Sherman in the center of the community.

East of the hamlet of Clymer, NY 474 turns to the northeast, paralleling an old railroad bed to the community of North Clymer, where NY 474 intersects the southern terminus of NY 76. Outside of North Clymer, the route returns to an east–west alignment prior to entering the town of Harmony and the village of Panama (intersecting CR 33 in the latter) in quick succession. NY 474 continues on, passing through the Harmony hamlet of Blockville and the North Harmony community of Ashville before terminating at NY 394 just west of the Lakewood village limits in the town of Busti.

History

All of what is now NY 474 was originally designated as part of NY 74 as part of the 1930 renumbering of state highways in New York. NY 74 also initially continued east from Lakewood to Jamestown by way of modern NY 394. The remainder of what is now NY 394 from Mayville south to Lakewood was designated as NY 17J. In the mid-1930s, NY 17J was extended eastward along NY 74 to rejoin NY 17 at Washington Street in Jamestown. The overlap was eliminated in the mid-1940s when NY 74 was truncated to Ashville. NY 74 remained unchanged until July 1, 1972 when it was renumbered to NY 474. The change in number allowed for the NY 74 designation to be used for the westward continuation of Vermont Route 74 in Essex County. The short continuation of NY 474 west to Wattsburg, Pennsylvania, was designated as PA 474 in the 1980s.

Major intersections

See also

References

External links

474
Transportation in Chautauqua County, New York